The WSA World Tour is the international squash tour and organized circuit, organized by the Women's Squash Association (WSA) for the 2014 squash season. The most important tournaments in the series are the World Championship, the US Open and the British Open. The tour features three categories of regular events, the World Series, which features the highest prize money and the best fields, and Gold and Silver tournaments. Players performances in the tour are rated by the WSA World Rankings. The Male equivalent is the PSA World Tour.

2014 Calendar
The Women's Squash Association organises the WSA World Tour, the female equivalent of the PSA World Tour Listed below are the most important events on the tour.

World Championship

World Series

Gold 50

Silver 35

Silver 25

Year end world top 10 players

Retirements
Following is a list of notable players (winners of a main tour title, and/or part of the WSA World Rankings top 30 for at least one month) who announced their retirement from professional squash, became inactive, or were permanently banned from playing, during the 2014 season:

 Kasey Brown (born 1 August 1985 in Taree) joined the pro tour in 2002, reached the singles no. 5 spot in December 2011. She won 11 WSA World Tour titles including the Greenwich Open in 2011 and the Australian Open in 2006. In 2011, she reached the final of the US Open, the biggest success of her career. She retired in October 2014 after competing a last time in the US Open.
 Manuela Manetta (born 6 June 1983 in Parma) joined the pro tour in 2002, reached the singles no. 25 spot in December 2007. She reached in 2010 the semifinals of the US Open and won more of ten National championships in Italia.

See also
Women's Squash Association (WSA)
WSA World Series 2014
WSA World Series Finals
WSA World Open
Official Women's Squash World Ranking
PSA World Tour 2014
2014 Women's World Team Squash Championships

References

External links
 WSA website

WSA World Tour seasons
2014 in squash